Austgötabreen is a glacier in Oscar II Land at Spitsbergen, Svalbard. The glacier has a length of about six kilometers, and is located between Huldrefjellet, Huldrehatten and Motalafjella. It is named after the Swedish county of Östergötland.

References

Glaciers of Spitsbergen